The 2007 Elite League speedway season was the 73rd season of the top division of speedway in the United Kingdom and governed by the Speedway Control Bureau (SCB), in conjunction with the British Speedway Promoters' Association (BSPA).

Season summary
In 2007, the league consisted of eleven teams for the start of the season. However on 31 May, the Oxford Cheetahs issued a statement explaining their resignation from the league. Their results were expunged from the table and the season was completed with ten teams. It was the last time that Oxford Cheetahs would compete in the league following the refusal of the landlords to allow speedway at Oxford and the subsequent closure of Oxford Stadium in 2012.

Coventry bounced back to winning ways completing the league and cup double. English duo Scott Nicholls and Chris Harris were once again the main catalysts to the team's success. The United States pair of Rory Schlein and Billy Janniro also added valuable contributions to the Coventry team.

Once again the Australian pair of Leigh Adams and Jason Crump were the best riders during the season and finished first and second in the league averages.

Final table

Play-offs
Semi-final decided over one leg. Grand Final decided by aggregate scores over two legs.

Semi-finals
Coventry Bees 55-38 Poole Pirates
Swindon Robins 50-42 Peterborough Panthers

Final
First leg

Second leg

The Coventry Bees were declared League Champions, winning on aggregate 102-83.

Elite League Knockout Cup
The 2007 Elite League Knockout Cup was the 69th edition of the Knockout Cup for tier one teams. Coventry Bees were the winners of the competition.

First round

Quarter-finals

Semi-finals

Final

First leg

Second leg

The Coventry Bees were declared Knockout Cup Champions, winning on aggregate 98-85.

Leading final averages

Riders & final averages
Belle Vue

 7.38
 7.03
 6.75	
 6.25
 6.22
 5.54
 5.46	
 4.98
 4.00
 3.04	
 1.65

Coventry

 9.60
 8.90
 8.15 
 6.82 
 6.70
 6.31
 6.29
 5.83

Eastbourne

 10.55
 8.52
 6.77
 6.64
 6.29
 5.49
 5.34
 5.33
 5.18
 4.17

Ipswich

 7.89
 7.25
 6.82 
 5.90
 5.72
 4.07
 4.00
 3.50

Lakeside

 9.50
 8.17
 7.86
 7.32
 6.14
 5.36
 5.14
 5.01
 4.77
 4.43	
 4.33
 4.00

Oxford (withdrew from league)

 7.00
 6.67
 5.79
 5.71
 5.04
 4.94
 4.00
 3.88
 3.82

Peterborough

 10.38
 8.38 
 7.74 
 6.59
 6.10
 6.03
 4.46
 4.46

Poole

 10.71
 9.96 
 6.49
 6.24
 6.22
 5.11
 5.00
 3.64
 2.26

Reading

 9.54
 8.00
 7.21
 6.29
 5.71
 5.24
 5.20
 5.05
 4.81

Swindon

 10.77
 8.48
 8.31
 7.62
 7.19
 6.10
 4.59

Wolverhampton

 9.22
 8.35 
 7.80
 7.74
 5.20
 4.37
 4.35
 4.28
 4.13
 2.44

See also
 List of United Kingdom Speedway League Champions
 Speedway in the United Kingdom
 Knockout Cup (speedway)

References

SGB Premiership
Speedway